Autódromo Parque Ciudad de Río Cuarto is a  motorsports circuit located near Río Cuarto, Argentina. It has hosted events in the Turismo Carretera series. It is one of the most important sporting arenas in the Province of Cordoba Argentina, besides being a place with wide appeal, next to the Autódromo Oscar Cabalén, the other Cordovan stage located in the town of Alta Gracia. It is administered by the Automobile Club of Rio Cuarto.

Events

 Former
 Formula 3 Sudamericana (1991–1992, 1994, 1996, 1998–2001)
 South American Super Touring Car Championship (1999)
 TC Mouras (2019, 2022)
 TC Pick Up (2019, 2022)
 TC2000 Championship (1979–1980, 1982–1988, 1990–1993, 1995–2004, 2012, 2019, 2021)
 TC2000 Series (2012–2019, 2021)
 TCR South America Touring Car Championship (2021)
 Top Race V6 (2006, 2015–2020, 2022)
 Turismo Carretera (1994–2012)
 Turismo Nacional (1972–1973, 1975–1978, 1985–1986, 1988, 1990–1994, 1996, 1998, 2000, 2006–2009, 2011–2012, 2018)

Lap records 

The official fastest race lap records at the Autódromo Parque Ciudad de Río Cuarto are listed as:

References 

Autódromo Parque Ciudad de Río Cuarto